The San Diego Padres are a Major League Baseball team based in San Diego, California.

Padres may also refer to
PADRES, a Chicano priests' organization
Tucson Padres, a minor league baseball team in Tucson, Arizona
San Diego Padres (PCL), a former minor league franchise in the Pacific Coast League
Padres FC, a football club in Australia
PADReS, a scientific group at the FERMI free electron facility in Trieste (Italy)

See also
Padre (disambiguation)